Soft tennis at the 2014 Asian Games was held in Incheon, South Korea from September 29 to October 4, 2014. All events were held at the Yeorumul Tennis Courts.

Soft tennis had team, doubles and singles events for men and women, as well as a mixed doubles competition.

Schedule

Medalists

Medal table

Participating nations
A total of 87 athletes from 13 nations competed in soft tennis at the 2014 Asian Games:

References

External links 
Official website

 
2014
2014 Asian Games
2014 Asian Games events
2014 in soft tennis